Prostitution in Singapore in itself is not illegal, but various prostitution-related activities are criminalized. This includes public solicitation, living on the earnings of a prostitute and maintaining a brothel. In practice, police unofficially tolerate and monitor a limited number of brothels. Prostitutes in such establishments are required to undergo periodic health checks and must carry a health card.

History
The rapid economic development of Singapore in the late nineteenth century combined with the city's gender imbalance (the male population greatly outnumbered the female) resulted in prostitution becoming a flourishing business and brothels a boom industry. The prostitutes were primarily Chinese and Japanese, imported as karayuki-san. It is estimated that 80% of the women and girls coming from China to Singapore in the late 1870s were sold into prostitution. The development of the Japanese enclave in Singapore at Middle Road, Singapore was connected to the establishment of brothels east of the Singapore River, namely along Hylam, Malabar, Malay and Bugis Streets during the late 1890s. By 1905 there were at least 109 Japanese brothels in Singapore.

Prostitution was seen by the colonial authorities as a necessary evil but a number of steps were taken to place restrictions on prostitution in the city. The registration of prostitutes and brothels was made compulsory in an attempt to prevent forced prostitution, and an Office to Protect Virtue was set up to help anyone unwillingly involved in prostitution. Shortly after the outbreak of World War I the colonial authorities banned prostitution by white women, and as a result the white brothels in Singapore (over twenty in 1914) had all closed by 1916.

A 1916 report described the misery and indecency of the prostitutes working in the red-light districts around Malay Street and Smith Street, and pressure was placed on the Colonial Office in Britain to further restrict licensed prostitution. Sir Arthur Young, governor-general of the Straits Settlements, considered prostitution indispensable for the colony's economy and labour supply but the sale of women and girls into prostitution was banned in 1917. Influential figures in the city's Japanese community who were concerned about dignity and morality put pressure on the Japanese Consulate to end Japanese prostitution. In 1920 the Consulate ordered the banishment of all Japanese prostitutes from Singapore, though some of the women remained as unlicensed prostitutes. The importation of women and girls for prostitution was banned in 1927 and brothels were banned in 1930, though prostitution remained legal.

During the Japanese occupation of Singapore (1942–45), brothels were set up for the use of Japanese servicemen. There were about twenty such brothels in the city, typically housed in deserted Chinese mansions. By the time of the surrender of Japan in 1945 prostitution was flourishing.

In the 1950s striptease acts took place at the city's getai shows, performed by specialist travelling dance troupes. The shows developed a sleazy image, partly as a result of stories about performers working as prostitutes. During this decade the city's police organised operations to reduce prostitution and Chief Minister Lim Yew Hock sought out suggestions as to how prostitution could be limited. Women's rights activist Shirin Fozdar described Singapore as "one big brothel" and the city was a regional centre for prostitution. The People's Action Party under the leadership by Lee Kuan Yew initially banned prostitution when they came to power in the late 1950s, switching to a strategy of containment in the mid 1960s.

From the 1950s to the early 1980s Bugis Street was famous for its nightly adult-themed shows performed by transvestites and groups of prostitutes would also openly solicit there. Neighbouring Johore Road was also part of the red-light district in the 1960s and the 1970s, with transgender prostitutes soliciting for business in the shophouses and alleys. Suppression of prostitution in the area began in the 1970s, and the trade was dispersed to the surrounding areas such as Jalan Besar. The old Bugis Street was demolished in the mid-1980s and Johore Road disappeared in the late 1990s.

Law

Commercial sex with underaged persons
Any person who obtains for consideration the sexual services of a person under 18 years of age (in other words, has commercial sex with such a person) commits an offence and may be punished with imprisonment of up to seven years or a fine or both. The term sexual services is defined to mean sexual services involving sexual penetration of the vagina or anus of a person by a part of another person's body other than the penis or by anything else, or penetration of the vagina, anus or mouth of a person by a man's penis. It is also an offence for a person to communicate with another person for the purpose of having commercial sex with a person under 18. These offences apply to acts that take place in as well as outside Singapore.

It is a crime for a person to:

make or organise any travel arrangements for or on behalf of any other person with the intention of facilitating the commission by that other person of an offence under section 376C (that is, offences relating to commercial sex with a minor under 18 outside Singapore), whether or not such an offence is actually committed by that other person;
transport any other person to a place outside Singapore with the intention of facilitating the commission by that other person of an offence under section 376C, whether or not such an offence is actually committed by that other person; or
print, publish or distribute any information that is intended to promote conduct that would constitute an offence under section 376C, or to assist any other person to engage in such conduct.

A person who is guilty of the offence may be punished with imprisonment of up to ten years, or a fine, or both.

Pimping
It is a criminal offence to:

sell, let for hire or otherwise dispose of or buy or hire or otherwise obtain possession of any woman or girl with intent that she shall be employed or used for the purpose of prostitution either within or without Singapore, or knowing or having reason to believe that she will be so employed or used;
procure any woman or girl to have either within or without Singapore carnal connection except by way of marriage with any male person or for the purpose of prostitution either within or without Singapore;
by threats or intimidation procure any woman or girl to have carnal connection except by way of marriage with any male person either within or without Singapore;
bring into Singapore, receive or harbour any woman or girl knowing or having reason to believe that she has been procured for the purpose of having carnal connection except by way of marriage with any male person or for the purpose of prostitution either within or without Singapore and with intent to aid such purpose;
knowing or having reason to believe that any woman or girl has been procured by threats or intimidation for the purpose of having carnal connection except by way of marriage with any male person, either within or without Singapore, to receive or harbour her with intent to aid such purpose;
knowing or having reason to believe that any woman or girl has been brought into Singapore in breach of section 142 of the Women's Charter or has been sold or purchased in breach of section 140(1)(a), to receive or harbour her with intent that she may be employed or used for the purpose of prostitution either within or without Singapore;
detain any woman or girl against her will on any premises with the intention that she shall have carnal connection except by way of marriage with any male person, or detain any woman or girl against her will in a brothel;
detain any woman or girl in any place against her will with intent that she may be employed or used for the purpose of prostitution or for any unlawful or immoral purpose; or
attempt to do any of the above acts.

The penalty is imprisonment not exceeding five years and a fine not exceeding $10,000. A male person who is convicted of a second or subsequent offence under the first six offences listed above is liable to be caned in addition to being imprisoned.

Prostitution and law enforcement in practice

Prostitution occupies an ambivalent position in Singaporean society. Major constraints control its practice despite it being legal. Police unofficially tolerate and monitor a limited number of brothels, where the prostitutes are regularly screened for health check-ups; however prostitution outside these brothels also exists such as via social escort agencies that usually adopt an internet website or Facebook presence. Prostitution outside the informally designated red-light areas operates via three main channels: internet advertising, street solicitation, and karaoke box and massage parlor work. The internet-advertised sex workers are based in anonymous hotels, and the profile of each sex worker is available from the internet advertisement. Interested clients contact the sex worker's agent through SMS, who arranges the timing and gives the hotel address to the client. Sex workers operating via such illegal pimps come primarily from Thailand, China and Philippines to Singapore for a short tourist visit, and therefore are not screened for health check-ups. There are also local Singaporean masseurs, therapists, call girls or social escorts in the industry working as sex workers on the pretext of being students at a local educational institution such as a polytechnic, models, working office professionals or ex-air stewardesses. Some of these say that they are certified therapists. Apart from the usual bilingual Singaporean Chinese that speak English as well as a mother tongue such as Mandarin, other ethnic races on the island such as Malay and Indian women also work as social escorts often using an English name, alongside Eurasians and Russians. Vietnamese prostitutes in Singapore charge high prices for their services.

There are grey areas such as social escorts which do not infringe on the women's charter in Singapore's law.

Apart from these regulated brothels, commercial sex workers can be found in many "massage" or "spa" establishments. Some massage parlours, including tui na outlets, employ women from mainland China and offer massages as a pretext for 'special' sexual services. These activities are illegal, and the operators of such massage establishments risk jail if exposed by anti-vice police raids. Yet, virtually everyone who visits these establishments in particular is fully aware of the sexual services provided within, and are there precisely because of it. The main red-light district in Singapore is located in Geylang. Orchard Towers, nicknamed the "Four Floors of Whores", is a shopping centre frequented by prostitutes. Some bars in Duxton Hill also offer sexual services, the most controversial ones being located at Adelphi basement which also houses a handful of law firms in the same building as well as within walking distance from the Ministry of Law in Singapore.

Vice busting
As the year 2015 came to an end, there had been an increase of around 40% of commercial crimes including prostitution or sex-related scams involving the internet; the public has been advised by the National Crime Prevention Council (Singapore) to be wary of controversial practices such as sugar mommies, credit-for-sex or internet love scams. With sensual massage parlours and other sex-related vice activities also appearing in suburban heartlands such as Woodlands, Sembawang, Sengkang, Jurong West, Yishun, Chinatown and River Valley, the Government of Singapore is looking at various options of regulating and punishing violations such as cases of unlicensed prostitutions or operators of brothels.

In 2016, examples of sentencing include Chew Tiong Wei who was jailed 85 months and fined S$130,000 for running an online vice ring and evading S$26,964.65 in income tax.

There are also reported cases of nightly vice activities involving transvestite prostitutes soliciting at a car park in the old Woodlands Town Garden which is adjacent to the Johor-Singapore Causeway. These are possibly Malaysian transvestites working full-time jobs in Singapore, moonlighting to save money for sex-change operations. Member of Parliament Halimah Yacob announced in 2016 a series of changes involving National Parks Board to clean up the sleaze in the area that involves upgrading the pre-existing park and malls there.

There are also rare cases of policemen impersonation on the pretext of robbing sex workers. These are offences punishable by the law in Singapore, as in the case of Teo Zhi Jie, Melvin Tan Shen Kang and Lee Qing Yew. Teo Zhi Jie has since been sentenced to two years and seven months in jail and 12 strokes of the cane.

Sex trafficking

Singapore is a destination country for women and girls from other Asian countries subjected to sex trafficking and a source country for Singaporean women and children subjected to sex trafficking. Some of the 965,000 foreign work permit holders that comprise more than one-quarter of Singapore's total labor force are vulnerable to trafficking; most victims migrate willingly. Traffickers compel victims into sex exploitation through illegal withholding of their pay, threats of forced repatriation without pay, restrictions on movement, and physical and sexual abuse. Foreign women sometimes arrive in Singapore with the intention of engaging in prostitution, but under the threat of serious harm or other forms of coercion, they become victims of sex trafficking.

The United States Department of State Office to Monitor and Combat Trafficking in Persons ranks Singapore as a 'Tier 2' country.

References
Notes

Cited Works

Further reading
Articles
.
.
.
.
.
.
.
.

Books
.
.
.
.
.
.
.
.

External links

Singaporeans fight sex trade with street lamps
Prostitution wave hits 'squeaky clean' Singapore
Singapore may raise minimum prostitution age to 18
Country Narrative – Singapore
Prostitution is not illegal in Singapore

 
Society of Singapore